Aleksandr Yuryevich Makarov (born 24 April 1996) is a Russian football player who plays as a right winger.

Club career
He made his debut in the Russian Football National League for FC Baltika Kaliningrad on 27 March 2016 in a game against FC Torpedo Armavir.

He made his PFC CSKA Moscow debut on 25 July 2017 in a 2017–18 UEFA Champions League third qualifying round game against AEK Athens.

On 9 February 2018, Makarov re-joined FC Tosno on loan until the end of the 2017–18 season.

In June 2018, Makarov suffered a torn ACL in his left knee.

On 19 February 2019, Makarov joined Avangard Kursk on loan for the remainder of the season.

On 30 August 2019, he moved to Avangard on a permanent basis.

International
He won the 2013 UEFA European Under-17 Championship with Russia national under-17 football team, he also participated with it in the 2013 FIFA U-17 World Cup.

Career statistics

Club

Honours

Club
Tosno
 Russian Cup: 2017–18

International
Russia U-17
 UEFA European Under-17 Championship: 2013

References

External links
 Profile by Russian Football National League

1996 births
People from Saratov Oblast
Living people
Russian footballers
Association football midfielders
FC Baltika Kaliningrad players
FC Tosno players
Russia youth international footballers
Russia under-21 international footballers
PFC CSKA Moscow players
Russian Premier League players
FC Avangard Kursk players
Sportspeople from Saratov Oblast